The Dance Fever Tour is the current concert tour by English indie rock band Florence and the Machine. The tour is in support of the band's fifth studio album Dance Fever (2022), and will visit North America, Europe and Oceania. The tour began on 15 April 2022 at Newcastle City Hall in Newcastle upon Tyne, England, UK, and is set to conclude on 2 July 2023 in Athens, Greece.

Setlist

European and North American Festivals 2022
"Shake It Out"
"King"
"What Kind of Man"
"Kiss with a Fist"
"Free"
"Rabbit Heart (Raise It Up)"
"Big God"
"What the Water Gave Me"
"Girls Against God"
"June"
"Hunger"
"Ship to Wreck"
"Never Let Me Go"
"Heaven Is Here"
"My Love"
"Dog Days Are Over"
Encore
  "Cosmic Love"
"Spectrum (Say My Name)"

North America
"Heaven Is Here"
"King"
"Ship to Wreck"
"Free"
"Daffodil"
"Dog Days Are Over"
"Girls Against God"
"Dream Girl Evil"
"Prayer Factory"
"Big God"
"Cassandra"
"What Kind of Man"
"Morning Elvis"
"June"
"Hunger"
"Choreomania"
"Kiss with a Fist"
"Cosmic Love"
"My Love"
"Restraint"
Encore
 "Never Let Me Go"
"Shake It Out"
"Rabbit Heart (Raise It Up)"

Shows

Notes

References

Florence and the Machine concert tours
2022 concert tours
2023 concert tours
Concert tours of North America
Concert tours of Europe